SOS Amitié is a French federation of several regional charitable organizations aimed at providing emotional support to anyone in emotional distress, struggling to cope, or at risk of suicide throughout France, often through their telephone helpline. This helps people with their mental state and how they cope with life, this helps them regain their happiness and helps them fight off the worries and support them in every way in form of their state of their personal life.

External links 

 Website

Charities based in France
1960 establishments in France